Rehli is one of the 230 Vidhan Sabha (Legislative Assembly) constituencies of Madhya Pradesh state in central India. This constituency came into existence in 1951, as one of the Vidhan Sabha constituencies of Madhya Pradesh state.

Overview
Rehli (constituency number 39) is one of the 8 Vidhan Sabha constituencies located in Sagar district. This constituency presently covers the entire Rehli tehsil of the district.

Rehli is part of Damoh Lok Sabha constituency along with seven other Vidhan Sabha segments, namely, Deori and Banda in Sagar district, Malhara in Chhatarpur district and Pathariya, Damoh, Jabera and Hatta in Damoh district.

Members of Legislative Assembly
 1951: Balaprasad Balaji, Indian National Congress
 1957: Manibhai J. Patel, Indian National Congress
 1962: Manibhai J. Patel, Indian National Congress
 1967: N. P. Tiwari, Bharatiya Jana Sangh
 1972: Gourishankar Pathak, Indian National Congress
 1977: Mahadeo Prasad Hazari, Indian National Congress
 1980: Mahadev Prasad Manoharlal, Indian National Congress(I)
 1985: Gopal Bhargava, Bharatiya Janta Party
 1990: Gopal Bhargava, Bharatiya Janta Party
 1993: Gopal Bhargava, Bharatiya Janta Party
 1998: Gopal Bhargava, Bharatiya Janta Party
 2003: Gopal Bhargava, Bharatiya Janta Party
 2008: Gopal Bhargava, Bharatiya Janta Party
 2013: Gopal Bhargava, Bharatiya Janta Party
 2018: Gopal Bhargava, Bharatiya Janta Party

See also
 Sagar district

References

Sagar district
Assembly constituencies of Madhya Pradesh